Woodward Field may refer to:

 Woodward Field (airport) in Camden, South Carolina, United States.
 Woodward Field (stadium) in Cheney, Washington, United States.
 Woodward Field (historical airport) in Salt Lake City, Utah, United States.  Salt Lake City's first airport, now evolved into the modern day Salt Lake City International Airport.